Atomic Rulers of the World (or just Atomic Rulers) is a 1965 film edited together for American television from films #1 and #2 of the 1957 Japanese short film series Super Giant.

Plot 
The story involves the superhero Starman (Super Giant in Japan) who is sent by the Emerald Planet to protect Earth from the nuclear holocaust threatened by the country of Metropol.

Principal cast 
 Ken Utsui as Super Giant a.k.a. Starman
 Reiko Seto as Reiko Okamoto
 Shōji Nakayama as Detective Okamoto
 Ryo Iwashita as Masao - Boy with Briefcase
 Noriko Katsuma as Yoshiko - Orphan Girl
 Yukihiko Ōsawa as Hiroshi - Kidnapped Boy
 Junko Ikeuchi as Sister Toshiko - Nun

Production

American adaptation 
The 9 Super Giant films were purchased for distribution to U.S. television and edited into 4 films by Walter Manley Enterprises and Medallion Films. The 2 original Japanese films which went into Atomic Rulers of the World (Super Giant and Super Giant Continues) were 49 minutes and 53 minutes in duration. The two films were edited into one 83-minute film. The original films were two parts of a complete story, but a total of 19 minutes was cut during the re-editing, dropping elements from both films. Also, most of the original music was scrapped and replaced by library cues. The result was a product considerably different from the Japanese originals.

Release

Home media 
Atomic Rulers of the World is currently available on two DVD releases. Something Weird Video with Image Entertainment released the film and another Starman film, Invaders from Space on a single disc on December 10, 2002. Alpha Video also released a budget-priced disc of the film by itself on June 22, 2004.

See also
 Attack from Space
 Evil Brain from Outer Space
 Invaders from Space
 Super Giant

Sources
 Ragone, August. THE ORIGINAL "STARMAN": The Forgotten Supergiant of Steel Who Fought for Peace, Justice and the Japanese Way Originally published in Planet X Magazine, included in Something Weird Video's DVD release.

External links
 
 

1965 films
1960s science fiction films
1960s Japanese-language films
Super Giant films
1960s Japanese films